GospoCentric Records was an Inglewood, California based Gospel music record label, started as an independent label by Vicki Mack Lataillade and Claude Lataillade in 1993. The label rose to prominence in the 1990s, largely on the runaway success of gospel artist Kirk Franklin. The label has grown to become one of the most prominent major gospel labels. GospoCentric later spawned the imprint B-Rite Music, which was used to launch artists like Trin-i-tee 5:7 and God's Property who found considerable mainstream success. GospoCentric was  purchased by Zomba Music Group in the mid 2000s, which also owned the major gospel label Verity Records. GospoCentric has since been defunct, and the purchase now led to the record label RCA Inspiration which is owned by Sony Music Entertainment.

List of artists 
 Byron Cage
 Kurt Carr
 Dorinda Clark Cole
 Kirk Franklin
 Jon Gibson
 God's Property
 R. J. Helton
 Tramaine Hawkins
 Dave Hollister
 Bobby Jones
 Donald Lawrence
 Jackie McCullough
 Stephanie Mills
 J. Moss
 New Direction
 Kelly Price
 Woody Rock
 Papa San
 The Soul Seekers
 Trin-i-tee 5:7
 Natalie Wilson

See also 
 List of record labels

References

External links 
Official GospoCentric Records website

American record labels
Record labels established in 1993
Gospel music record labels
Zomba Group of Companies subsidiaries
Record labels based in California
1993 establishments in California